Poble Lliure (English: Free People) is a Catalan socialist and pro independence political organisation, which is part of the Pro Independence Catalan Left. Poble Lliure was founded in November 2014 from historical militants of the Movement for Defence of the Land (MDT) and independents linked to social movements. Poble Lliure supports the Front Republicà, the Candidatura d'Unitat Popular and the Assemblea Nacional Catalana (ANC).

References

Political parties in Catalonia
Political parties established in 2014
Catalan independence movement
Socialist parties in Catalonia
2014 establishments in Catalonia